State Route 245 (SR 245) is an east–west state highway in the western portion of the U.S. state of Ohio.  The western terminus of SR 245 is at an intersection with SR 29 near Rosewood.  Its eastern terminus is at an exit ramp with U.S. Route 33 (US 33), US 36, and SR 4 in Marysville.

Route description

SR 245 travels through the northern portion of Champaign County, the southern portion of Logan County and then re-enters Champaign County; the highway also travels through the western part of Union County.  No segment of this highway is a part of the National Highway System.

History
SR 245 was first designated in 1962.  The original routing of the highway consisted of the same route as today.
Prior to June 1963, SR 245 was signed as SR 275. The route was renumbered at that time due to Ohio renumbering state highways sharing the same number as Interstate highways; Interstate 275 forced the renumbering of SR 275.

Major intersections

See also

References

External links 

245
Transportation in Champaign County, Ohio
Transportation in Logan County, Ohio
Transportation in Union County, Ohio